Marco Vinicio Redondo Quirós is a deputy from Cartago, serving in the Legislative Assembly of Costa Rica for the 2014-2018 legislative session.

Redondo has a bachelor's degree in business administration. 
 
Redondo was Mayor of Oreamuno, a municipality in Cartago. He was investigated by the Organismo de Investigación Judicial (Judicial Investigation Unit) for an issue relating to Redondo's property. As of March 2014, the case was still being adjudicated. Officials from Redondo's party, the Citizens' Action Party (PAC for its Spanish initials), including Emilia Molina Cruz and Olivier Pérez González, said they were unaware of the case.  defended Redondo, saying that he had high ethics and that he was being persecuted for his time as mayor of Oreamuno.

At the time of his election, Redondo was 47 years old. Redondo is a member of the Citizens' Action Party.

References

Living people
Members of the Legislative Assembly of Costa Rica
Citizens' Action Party (Costa Rica) politicians
People from Cartago Province
Costa Rican businesspeople
Year of birth missing (living people)